Outta Control may refer to:

Songs 
 Outta Control (Baby Bash song), 2009
 "Outta Control" (50 Cent song), 2005
 "Outta Control", a song by Edgar Winter from Jasmine Nightdreams
 "Outta Control", a song by J786
 "Outta Control", a song by Peter Andre from Revelation
 "Outta Control", a song by Peter Pan Speedrock from Spread Eagle
 "Outta Control", a song by Sloppy Meateaters from Shameless Self-Promotion
 "Outta Control", a song by Styles of Beyond from Megadef
 "Outta Control", a song by Sword from Metalized
 "She's So (Outta Control)", a song by M-Flo from Square One

Albums 
 Outta Control, a 1999 album by LMT Connection
 Outta Control, a 1994 album by Michael Peace
 Outta Control, a 1995 EP by The Delinquents
 Outta Control, a 2005 EP by Static Thought

Other entertainment 
 Outta Control (dance project) or Killer Bunnies, a 1995-1998 Canadian techno/house music group
 Nickelodeon: Outta Control, a former attraction at Alton Towers theme park, Staffordshire, England
 Ranma ½: Outta Control, season 4 of the anime series Ranma ½

See also 
 Out of Control (disambiguation)